She Like Electric is the debut album recorded by Seattle sister duo, Smoosh.  They were twelve and ten years old at the time they recorded it. The Japanese release of this album features a fifteenth track called "Inner to the Outer".

Track listing

References

External links
Review of She Like Electric

2004 debut albums
Smoosh albums
Albums produced by Johnny Sangster